

Transmitter Failure is the second album by American singer-songwriter Jenny Owen Youngs. It was released May 26, 2009, by the Nettwerk label.

Track listing

Personnel

Performance
Jenny Owen Youngs – vocals, acoustic guitar, electric guitar, banjo, bass, ukulele
Chris Kuffner – double bass, bass, voice
Adam Christgau – drum kit, hands and feet, percussion, voice
Dan Romer – electric guitar, keys, glockenspiel, marimba, programming, accordion, organ, banjo, acoustic guitar
Bess Rogers – voice, electric guitar, flute
Meredith Godreau – voice
Saul Simon-MacWilliams – voice, moog
Hiroko Taguchi – violin
Olivier Manchon – violin
Jessica Troy – viola
Ben Kalb – cello
Brad Gordon – mbira, percussion
Wil Farr – voice
Kenny Warren – trumpet
Dave Smith – trombone

Recording
Production and arrangements by Dan Romer
Mixing by Ryan Freeland
Mastering by Gavin Lurssen
Engineering by – Dan Romer, Michael Trepagnier (strings), Adam Thompson (piano), George Gregory (strings and piano), Jesse Lauter (basic tracking), Nick Smeraski (basic tracking)

References

2009 albums
Jenny Owen Youngs albums
Nettwerk Records albums